Praise singers or Griots are orators and singers in West Africa.

Praise singer may also refer to:

Imbongi, a term used for praise singers in Southern Africa
The Praise Singer, a historical novel